Chimila (Shimizya), also known as Ette Taara, is a Chibchan language of Colombia, spoken by the Chimila people, who live between the lower Magdalena river, the Sierra Nevada de Santa Maria and the Cesar river. At one time Chimila was grouped with the Malibu languages, but then Chimila became classified as a Chibchan language.

Julian Steward, in the 1950 Handbook of South American Indians, reports a communication from Gerardo Reichel-Dolmatoff that he considered Chimila to be one of the Arawakan languages, and would thus be expected to be like Tairona, one of the Chibchan languages.

Phonology
Although an accurate description of the phonology of Chimila is yet to be produced, a preliminar sketch can be found in Trillos Amaya's (1997) grammar.

The Chimila languages has 5 oral vowels /i, u, e, o, a/. These basic segments can also be realized as short, long, aspirated and glottalized.

The consonant inventory of Chimila consists of 23 phonemes. Voiceless stops are essentially realized as in Spanish, without any additional feature. On the other hand, voiced stops are prenasalized. The same is true for affricates. In addition, there is also a plain voiced velar stop and a plain voiced palatal affricate. Velar consonants also exhibit a labialized counterpart. The trill /ɾ/ is slightly preglottalized.

Plain voiced and prenasalized stops and affricates have been shown to contrast, e.g. kaː "breast", gaː "excrement" and ᵑgaː "wing, feather". The most frequent type of consonant cluster is formed by a stop and /ɾ/. In general, lenis consonants, except for prenasalized ones, /x/, /ɾ/ and /w/, are realized as fortis whenever they follow the stressed syllable.

According to Trillos Amaya (1997), Chimila also has two tones. In monosyllabic words ending in a long vowel, tone is contrastive, e.g. tóː "maraca" (rising tone), tòː "heart" (falling tone). In polysyllabic words, the distribution of tones is often predictable: if the syllable following the vowel that bears the tone starts with a geminated consonant or /r/, the tone is falling, however, if the following consonant is not geminated, then the tone is rising.

Vocabulary
In early twentieth century, anthropologist Dolmatoff (1947) was able to collect an extensive sample of Chilima words. The following table shows some basic vocabulary items of the language:

A provisional writing system has been developed by the Summer Institute of Linguistics. Some of the words mentioned above are now spelled differently, as shown in the following table:

Chimila-derived names
"Cesar", the name of both the Cesar River and the Cesar Department, is an adaptation from the Chimila word Chet-tzar or Zazare ("calm water") into Spanish.

Guatapurí derives from the Chimila for "cold water", and provides the name of the Guatapurí River.

Notes

References
 
 

Languages of Colombia
Chibchan languages